Bohumil Jelínek-Milka was a Czech footballer who played as a striker.

Club career
During his playing career, Jelínek played for Smíchov.

International career
On 1 April 1906, Jelínek made his debut for Bohemia in Bohemia's second game, starting in a 1–1 draw against Hungary. Jelínek would later make one more appearance for Bohemia on 7 April 1907, scoring in a 5–2 defeat against the same opposition.

International goals
Scores and results list Bohemia's goal tally first.

Notes

References

Date of birth unknown
Date of death unknown
Association football forwards
Czech footballers
Czechoslovak footballers
Bohemia international footballers